Auenstein may refer to:

Auenstein, Switzerland, a municipality in the canton of Aargau
, a part of the municipality of Ilsfeld in the district of Heilbronn, Baden-Württemberg
Schloss Auenstein, a castle at Auenstein, Switzerland